John Kekes (born 22 November 1936) is Professor Emeritus of Philosophy at the University at Albany, SUNY.

Education
Kekes received his Ph.D. in philosophy from the Australian National University.

Work
Kekes is the author of a number of books on ethics, including The Examined Life (Penn State University Press, 1988), The Morality of Pluralism (Princeton University Press, 1996), Moral Wisdom and Good Lives (Cornell University Press, 1997), The Art of Life (Cornell University Press, 2005), The Roots of Evil (Cornell University Press, 2007), Enjoyment (Oxford University Press, 2009), and The Enlargement of Life: Moral Imagination at Work (Cornell University Press, 2010).

Kekes is also a noted conservative thinker. His works on political philosophy include Against Liberalism (Cornell University Press, 1988), A Case for Conservatism (Cornell University Press, 1998), The Illusions of Egalitarianism (Cornell University Press, 2007) and The Art of Politics: The New Betrayal of America and How to Resist It (Encounter, 2008). A shorter summary of some of Kekes's objections to modern liberalism, specifically the influence of philosophers John Rawls and Ronald Dworkin, can be found in his 2001 article "Dangerous Egalitarian Dreams".

Bibliography
 Moral Tradition and Individualism, Princeton University press (1991).
 Facing Evil, Princeton University press (1993).
 The Morality of Pluralism, Princeton University press (1996). 
 A Case for Conservatism, Cornell University Press (1998).
 Against Liberalism, Cornell University Press (1999).
 The Illusions of Egalitarianism, Cornell University Press (2007).
 The Roots of Evil, Cornell University Press (2007).
 Enjoyment: The Moral Significance of Styles of Life, Oxford University Press (2010).
 The Nature of Philosophical Problems: Their Causes and Implications, Oxford University Press (2014).
 How Should We Live?: A Practical Approach to Everyday Morality, University of Chicago Press (2014).
 The Human Condition, Oxford University Press (2014).
 Human Predicaments: And What to Do about Them, University of Chicago Press (2016).

Notes

References
Albany University. Albany University staff database, Person Entry | John Kekes.

External links
Online Article by John Kekes

1936 births
20th-century American philosophers
21st-century American philosophers
American political philosophers
Analytic philosophers
Australian National University alumni
Conservatism
American ethicists
Living people
University at Albany, SUNY faculty